Elaea  ( Elaíā) was mentioned by Pliny (Natural History, v.32) as the ancient name of an island in the Propontis (Sea of Marmara), in Bithynia. It was one of the Demonisi group (Princes' Islands), but it is not certain which of the several small islands Pliny referred to.

References
 Smith, William (editor), "Elaea", Dictionary of Greek and Roman Geography (London: Walton and Maberly, Murray, 1854)
 Hazlitt, William, "Elæa", The Classical Gazetteer (London: Whittaker, 1851)

Geography of Bithynia
Islands of the Sea of Marmara
Mythological islands